Karel Berman (14 April 1919 in Jindřichův Hradec, Czechoslovakia – 11 August 1995 in Prague, Czech Republic) was a Jewish Czech opera singer, composer and opera director.

Life
After extensive musical education, Karel Berman started his career as a bass singer of opera in Opava. In March, 1943, Berman was deported to Theresienstadt, where he took part in cultural life as a singer, composer and director. On 11 July 1944, for example, he and Rafael Schächter produced the "Four songs to words of Chinese poetry" by Pavel Haas for the first time. In 1944 he composed Suite Terezin in three movements ('Terezin', 'Horror', and 'Alone'); a work which musicologist Bret Web described as "a rare in situ tone portrait of life in a Nazi camp". 

Later he was also imprisoned in Kaufering and Auschwitz. He survived the camps and later became famous as an opera singer. In 1953, he joined the Prague National Theatre opera.  Berman is also remembered as an opera director, having directed more than 70 operas. He taught at the Prague Conservatory from 1961–71, and from 1964 at the Academy of Performing Arts in Prague.

Works 
 1944 Poupata ("Buds") Bass-baritone songs and piano
Majové ráno (Eva Nonfriedová)
Co se děje při probuzení (Kamil Bednář)
Děti si hrají (Josef Hora)
Před usnutím č. 1 (František Halas)
Velikonoční (František Halas)
 1938 - 1945 Reminiscences Suite Piano (first published in 2000)
Terezín Suite Piano
Broučci ("Glow-worms" - after the children's book by Jan Karafiát) Soprano and piano (later made world-famous by Jiří Trnka as a cartoon)

Recordings
Historical recording opera arias, conducted František Dyk

Notes

References 
 Vrkočová, Ludmila: Slovníček hudebních osobností. 1999. 
 Herbert Gantschacher Viktor Ullmann - Zeuge und Opfer der Apokalypse / Witness and Victim of the Apocalypse / Testimone e vittima dell'Apocalisse / Svědek a oběť apokalypsy / Prič in žrtev apokalipse. ARBOS-Edition, Arnoldstein - Klagenfurt - Salzburg - Vienna - Prora - Prague 2015, p. 125, p. 139, p. 271, p. 286

External links
 Music and the Holocaust - Karel Berman, holocaustmusic.ort.org; accessed 29 September 2017.

1919 births
1995 deaths
20th-century classical composers
Czechoslovak male opera singers
20th-century Czech male opera singers
Academic staff of the Prague Conservatory
Academic staff of the Academy of Performing Arts in Prague
Czech classical composers
Czech male classical composers
Czech Jews
Jewish classical musicians
Operatic basses
People from Jindřichův Hradec
Auschwitz concentration camp survivors
Theresienstadt Ghetto survivors
Recipients of the Thalia Award